Julius Mankell (8 June 1828 – 23 February 1897) was a Swedish libertarian politician and military historian.

1828 births
1897 deaths
Members of the Första kammaren